After the coup against dictator Jesús Jiménez Zamora on April 27, 1870, and after the brief government of Bruno Carranza Ramírez,  Tomás Guardia Gutiérrez succeeded on August 8 and elections were called by the then provisional president Guardia on 8 of May 1872. It was the first time that the presidency was exercised by a military.

For these elections the Constitution of 1871 was in force, which established that all Costa Rican males of 20 years of age or 18 if they were married or were professors of a science or whose income was according to their social condition, could vote. This allowed the majority of male citizens to vote (female suffrage was approved until 1949) since it did not required to know how to read or write and the economic requirement was very ambiguous and could be applied to almost any person of any social class. The vote was public and only chose the second-degree electors. The second-degree electors had to be over 21 years old, literate and had an annual income of 150 pesos or more or at least 500 pesos in property.

References

Elections in Costa Rica
1872 elections in Central America
One-party elections
1872 in Costa Rica